Touko Juhani Aalto (born 1 April 1984) is a Finnish politician. He was chairman of the Green League from 2017 to 2018. He represented the electoral district of Central Finland in the Parliament of Finland 2015–2019.

Life 

Aalto was born in Savonlinna and later lived in Joensuu. He currently lives in Jyväskylä, Finland. Aalto graduated as Bachelor of Social Sciences from the University of Jyväskylä in 2008. He worked as a cleaner and salesperson before becoming parliamentary assistant of MP Jani Toivola in 2011.

Aalto was elected to the City Council of Jyväskylä in 2008 and to the Parliament in 2015. He is the first Green Member of the Parliament from Central Finland. He is currently member of the Finance Committee of the Parliament. In the 2017 municipal elections, Aalto received the most personal votes in Jyväskylä at the same time when the Green League became the largest party of Jyväskylä. On 17 June 2017, Aalto won the Green League leadership election, and became the chairman of the party.

In September 2018, Aalto took a sick leave due to exhaustion and his duties were temporarily handed to the first deputy chair Maria Ohisalo. In October 2018, he announced that he is resigning from his post, citing depression and fatigue. Aalto took part in the 2019 parliamentary election, but was not re-elected.

Electoral history

Municipal elections

European Parliament elections

Parliamentary elections

Personal life
Aalto was married with Johanna Pietiläinen from 2015 to 2017.

References

External links 
 

1984 births
Living people
People from Savonlinna
Green League politicians
Members of the Parliament of Finland (2015–19)
University of Jyväskylä alumni